The Basketball Champions League is a seasonal basketball competition established in 2016. It is open to all member nations of FIBA Europe. After a regular season and playoffs, two teams face off in the final.

Currently, three teams have won the Basketball Champions League final while five teams have played in it.

List of finals

 The "Season" column refers to the season the competition was held, and wikilinks to the article about that season.
 The wikilinks in the "Score" column point to the article about that season's final game.

References

finals